The 2008 CIS Men's Final 8 Basketball Tournament was held March 14–16, 2008. For the first time, it was held at Scotiabank Place in Ottawa, Ontario and was hosted by the Carleton Ravens.

The tournament will be remembered for Acadia's upset over Carleton in the semi-final, ending their run of five consecutive national titles. Brock won their first title since 1992.

Bracket

References

2008
2007–08 in Canadian basketball
Sports competitions in Ottawa